James Potter (born 20 November 1941) is a Northern Irish former footballer who played as a wing half in the Football League for Darlington. He began his career as a youngster with Sunderland, without playing first-team football for the club, and after leaving Darlington he returned to his native Northern Ireland to join Linfield.

References

1941 births
Living people
Association footballers from Belfast
Association footballers from Northern Ireland
Association football wing halves
Sunderland A.F.C. players
Darlington F.C. players
Linfield F.C. players
English Football League players